North Carolina Highway 343 (NC 343) is a primary state highway in the U.S. state of North Carolina.  It serves to connect the county seat of  Camden with both the north and south ends of Camden County.

Route description
NC 343 begins at the intersection of Wharf Road (SR 1104) and Texas Road (SR 1100) in Old Trap.  Going in an northeasterly direction and parallel to Pasquotank River to its west, it goes through the communities of Alder Branch, Shiloh and Taylors Beach. Passing through Camden, it links with U.S. Route 158 (US 158).  Continuing northeasterly, it continues through the communities of Spences Corner, Lambs Corner, Burnt Mills and finally South Mills, where it joins US 17 Business (US 17 Bus.). Routed alongside the Great Dismal Swamp Canal, it ends at US 17 just north of South Mills.

The northern section, between Camden and South Mills, is frequently used in the summer months as an alternative route to and from the Outer Banks, from travelers from the Hampton Roads metro area of Virginia.

History

Junction list

See also
 North Carolina Bicycle Route 4 - Concurrent with NC 343 from US 158 to Scotland Road in Camden

References

External links

 
 NCRoads.com: N.C. 343

343
Transportation in Camden County, North Carolina